Fred R. Stanton, born Frederick R. Schwerd, (1881 - May 27, 1925) was an actor in the United States. He had numerous film roles and also performed in theater.

He portrays a Native American in Son of the Wolf and has a memorable knife fight with the star. He died on May 27, 1925, in Los Angeles of stomach cancer.

Filmography
Daredevil Kate (1916) as Bently
The Great Secret (1917) as The Great Master
De Luxe Annie (1918) as Detective Cronin
The Great Victory (1919) as Sergeant Gross
The Great Secret (serial) (1920), a serial as The Great Master
The Fighting Chance (1920) as Beverly Plank
The Spirit of Good (1920) as Neal Bradford
Jenny Be Good (1920) as Aaron Shuttles 
The Silver Horde (1920) as big George Bolt
The Fire Bride (1922)
Her Sturdy Oak (1921) as Ranch Foreman
Perils of the Yukon (1922), a serial as Ivan Petroff
The Son of the Wolf (1922)
Danger Ahead (1923)
Little Church Around the Corner (1923) as The Sheriff
A Million to Burn (1923) as Langden
Canyon of the Fools (1923) as Jim Harper / Polhill
Trifling with Honor (1923) as Lute Clotz
When a Man's a Man (1924) as Nick Cambert
Find Your Man (1924) as Sheriff

References

1881 births
1925 deaths
American male silent film actors
20th-century American male actors
Deaths from stomach cancer
American male stage actors
Deaths from cancer in California